Volumes of Blood: Horror Stories is a 2016 American horror anthology film consisting of segments directed by Sean Blevins, John William Holt, Jon Maynard, Nathan Thomas Milliner, Justin Seaman and James Treakle. The film's screenplay was written by Sean Blevins, Nathan Thomas Milliner, P. J. Starks, and Jason Turner.

A sequel to the 2015 film Volumes of Blood, Volumes of Blood: Horror Stories was produced by Eric Huskisson, David Justice, P. J. Starks, and Devin Taylor. Like its predecessor, the film was shot in Owensboro, Kentucky.

Reception
Jerry Smith of Fangoria called the film "hands down, the most entertaining anthology in years." It was also listed in Fangoria's "Year in Horror: Top 10 Horror Films" Matt Boiselle of Dread Central awarded the film three out of five stars. 
Halloween Daily News proclaimed the film to be a "Killer Anthology" and "highly recommended as one of the most ambitious anthologies and independent horror releases in recent years..."
Crytptic Rock lauded the crew by saying, "those involved in the making of these films are skilled with the rather rare gift of taking coal-like resources and turning them into cinematic diamonds" and also awarded the film 4 out of 5 stars.

Awards
The film won "Best Horror Anthology" at the 2016 Fright Night Film Fest.

Sequel
In a 2015 interview, P. J. Starks said he had ideas for a third volume. 
In an interview with Dread Central, producer P. J. Stark announced a second and final sequel called Devil's Knight: Volumes of Blood 3.

References

External links
 Volumes of Blood

2016 films
2016 horror films
American teen horror films
American horror anthology films
American independent films
2010s English-language films
2010s American films